The term zone of possible agreement (ZOPA), also known as zone of potential agreement  or bargaining range, describes the range of options available to two parties involved in sales and negotiation, where the respective minimum targets of the parties overlap. Where no such overlap is given, in other words where there is no rational agreement possibility, the inverse notion of NOPA (no possible agreement) applies. Where there is a ZOPA, an agreement within the zone is rational for both sides. Outside the zone no amount of negotiation should yield an agreement.

An understanding of the ZOPA is critical for a successful negotiation, but the negotiants must first know their BATNA (best alternative to a negotiated agreement), or "walk away positions". To determine whether there is a ZOPA both parties must explore each other's interests and values. This should be done early in the negotiation and be adjusted as more information is learned. Essential is also the ZOPA’s size. Where a broad ZOPA is given, the parties might use strategies and tactics to influence the distribution within the ZOPA. Where the parties have a small ZOPA, the difficulty lies in finding agreeable terms.

Identifying a ZOPA
To determine whether there is a positive bargaining zone each party must understand their bottom line or worst case price. For example, Paul is selling his car and refuses to sell it for less than $5,000 (his worst case price). Sarah is interested and negotiates with Paul. If she offers him anything higher than $5,000 there is a positive bargaining zone, if she is unwilling to pay more than $4,500 there is a negative bargaining zone.

A ZOPA exists if there is an overlap between each party's reservation price (bottom line). A negative bargaining zone is when there is no overlap. With a negative bargaining zone both parties may (and should) walk away.
Through a rational analysis of the ZOPA in business negotiations, you will be better equipped to avoid the traps of reaching an agreement for agreement's sake and viewing the negotiation as a pie to be divided.

Negative Bargaining Zone
It occurs when people negotiate and cannot reach a ZOPA,so they are in negative bargaining zone. So they cannot reach a deal in negative bargaining zone, as there is no mutual understanding among them.
For example: Sam wants to sell his house for $9200 to buy a better apartment. but Alex wants to buy it for $7800 and cannot go higher, here the negative bargaining zone occurs.

Overcoming a negative bargaining zone

A negative bargaining zone may be overcome by "enlarging the pie". In integrative negotiations when dealing with a variety of issues and interests, parties that combine interests to create value reach a far more rewarding agreement. Behind every position there are usually more common interests than conflicting ones.

In the example above, Sarah is unwilling to pay more than $4,500 and Paul won't accept anything less than $5,000. However, Sarah may be willing throw in some skis she received as a gift but never used. Paul, who was going to use some of the car money to buy some skis, agrees. Paul accepted less than his bottom line because value was added to the negotiation. Both parties "win".

A negotiator should always start considering both parties' ZOPA at the earliest stage of his or her preparations and constantly refine and adjust these figures as the process proceeds. For every interest there often exists several possible solutions that could satisfy it.

See also 
 Bargaining
 Best alternative to a negotiated agreement
 Search theory
 Transaction cost

References

Further reading
 Jung, Stefanie; Krebs, Peter (2019). "The Essentials of Contract Negotiation". doi:10.1007/978-3-030-12866-1.

 

Business terms
Personal selling
Negotiation
Dispute resolution